The Unified Fire Authority of Greater Salt Lake provides fire protection and emergency medical services for the unincorporated Salt Lake County, Utah as well as for 9 cities located within the Salt Lake Metropolitan Area. These cities include Alta, Cottonwood Heights, Eagle Mountain, Herriman, Holladay, Midvale, Riverton and Taylorsville.

History
The Unified Fire Authority got its start on November 21, 1921 when the Salt Lake County Fire Department was formed. Discussions for the formation of a unified department within the Salt Lake Valley began over half a century later in 1998. Salt Lake County Fire had been providing emergency services to several contract cities in addition to the Unincorporated Salt Lake County. These cities wanted to play a more active role in the fire administration. In 2004, the department ceased operation as a County government entity and became the Unified Fire Authority.

US&R Task Force - UT-TF1

The Unified Fire Authority is the sponsoring agency of Urban Search and Rescue Utah Task Force 1, one of the 28 FEMA Urban Search and Rescue Task Forces in the United States.  Managed daily by full-time staff of Unified Fire under the direction of the Federal Emergency Management Agency - Urban Search & Rescue, Response Directorate/Operations Division.

Stations and apparatus

References

Adopted Budget 2017

External links

 
 UFA Wildland Homepage

Fire departments in Utah
2003 establishments in Utah
Salt Lake County, Utah